Scott Chantler (born February 9, 1972) is a Canadian cartoonist and illustrator known for his historical and children's fantasy graphic novels.

Early life
Chantler was born in Deep River, Ontario, Canada. He attended the University of Waterloo in Waterloo, Ontario, majoring in fine arts/film studies. He later studied computer animation at Sheridan College in Oakville, Ontario.

Career
Chantler began as a commercial illustrator in a corporate communications firm. In 2000, he began working in webcomics scene. With writer J. Torres, he went on to publish a graphic novel, Days Like This, and after more such work eventually began writing as well as drawing graphic novels. In 2015 he was appointed Cartoonist-in-Residence at the University of Windsor.

Awards
He is the winner of a 2011 Joe Shuster Award in the Comics for Kids category for the first book in the Three Thieves series, Tower of Treasure.

Days Like This was one of 23 books in the "On That Note: Music and Musicians" section of the American Library Association's 2004 Popular Paperbacks for Young Adults list.

Chantler was nominated for a 2005 Russ Manning Most Promising Newcomer Award, for the graphic novel Scandalous, written by J. Torres. He was nominated for an Eisner Award in 2008 for Best Publication for Teens, for Northwest Passage: The Annotated Collection, and in 2011 for Best Reality-Based Work, for Two Generals, a graphic memoir of World War II based on his grandfather's experiences. Northwest Passage also earned a 2008 Harvey Award nomination for Special Award for Excellent in Presentation, and a 2008 Joe Shuster Award nomination for Cover by a Canadian Comic Book Artist.

Books

Three Thieves
Tower of Treasure, 2010
Sign of the Black Rock, 2011
The Captive Prince, 2012
The King's Dragon, 2014
Pirates of the Silver Coast, 2014
The Dark Island, 2016
The Iron Hand, 2016

Others
Days Like This (Oni Press, 2003. .)
Northwest Passage: The Annotated Collection (Oni Press, 2007. .)
Two Generals (McClelland & Stewart, 2010. .)

References

External links

Scott Chantler official website
Scott Chandler at Kids Can Press

1972 births
Canadian cartoonists
Canadian graphic novelists
Artists from Ontario
Writers from Ontario
Living people
University of Windsor alumni